Nippia is a genus of tephritid  or fruit flies in the family Tephritidae.

Species
Nippia alboscutellata

References

Dacinae
Tephritidae genera